Puffy: P.S. I Love You is a game released in 1999 for the PlayStation, starring Japanese rock stars Puffy AmiYumi. The game was controlled using a light gun. Peculiarly enough, the title is a homage to The Beatles song "P.S. I Love You", from their Please Please Me album.

The gameplay used footage from a variety of PUFFY's concerts, to which players would shoot soda cans out of their cannons.

References

1999 video games
Japan-exclusive video games
Light gun games
PlayStation (console) games
PlayStation (console)-only games
Puffy AmiYumi
Video games based on musicians
Video games developed in Japan